Ripley's Believe It or Not!, is a television series hosted by Dean Cain and aired on TBS from 2000 to 2003. It is based on the Ripley's Believe It or Not! franchise.

Production and broadcast
In March 1994, a pilot for The New Ripley's Believe It or Not had been ordered for ABC.

In December 1998, TBS Superstation outbid two broadcast network competitors to purchase the rights from Columbia TriStar Television Distribution for 22 hour-long episodes of The New Ripley's Believe It or Not, to premiere on TBS in January 2000. The series would air weekly, and would be an update of an earlier Ripley's program that aired from 1982 to 1986. The new series was to involve correspondents being sent around the world to report on amazing and unusual subjects. TBS had an option to purchase additional seasons, and had won the rights because it agreed to a full season without seeing a pilot. In June 1999, Erik Nelson was signed on to serve as executive producer for the series. In December 1999, Dean Cain was hired to host the new series. Cain also served as a producer on the show, alongside Dan Jbara.

The new series, simply titled Ripley's Believe It or Not!, premiered on TBS on January 12, 2000, immediately following the 1999 animated series on France 3, Family Channel, and Fox Family Channel. The series was primarily shot at a 15,000 square-foot Ripley's warehouse in Sylmar, Los Angeles. Most episodes open with an act that is performed in front of a live audience, while the rest of the episode involves Cain introducing various segments, each one for a different subject. Gregory Jbara served as one of the narrators for the different segments. Kelly Packard became a field correspondent in 2002, and would host coverage of events in which people demonstrate their unusual abilities, usually in front of an audience. The show also features such regular elements as "Spot the Not," a weekly trivia segment in which viewers are challenged to pick the claim that is not real and a special "Ripley's Record" commemoration for people who break a world record while appearing on the show. Reruns of the series began airing on The WB in September 2001, and were expected to continue until December 2001.

In early 2003, Sony Pictures Television ordered an 11-episode fourth season. In March 2003, 11 additional episodes were ordered for the fourth season, which aired on Wednesday evenings at 9:00 p.m. For its timeslot, the series was the top-rated program among its target audience of people between the ages of 18-34, 18-49 and 25-54. In September 2003, Sony Pictures announced a trimmed half-hour version of the existing show that would start airing in reruns on local television channels across the United States.

After the series' cancellation in 2003, Columbia TriStar Home Entertainment (now known as Sony Pictures Home Entertainment) would produce a DVD showing highlights from all 4 seasons known as The Best of Ripley's Believe It or Not!. The show would receive a Philippines counterpart on the GMA Network in 2008, hosted by Chris Tiu.

Reruns later began airing on Canada's SPACE station as of 2012. As of 2017, hour-long reruns aired on Chiller before the channel ceased operations at year's end.

Episodes

Season 1 (2000)

Season 2 (2001)

Season 3 (2002)

Season 4 (2003)

References

External links
 
 

Ripley's Believe It or Not! television series
American non-fiction television series
Television series by Sony Pictures Television
2000s American television series
2000 American television series debuts
2003 American television series endings
TBS (American TV channel) original programming